Eva Kotamanidou (Greek: Εύα Κοταμανίδου) was a Greek actress.

Born on March 16, 1936, in Nea Filadelfeia, Athens, she became most known for O Thiassos (1975), Topio stin omichli (1988) and Alexander the Great (1980). She died on November 26, 2020, aged 84.

References

External links 
 

1936 births
2020 deaths
Greek film actresses
20th-century Greek actresses
Actresses from Athens
Greek television actresses
Greek stage actresses
Greek MPs 1989 (June–November)